Marjorie "Marge" Ostroushko (born March 14, 1951) is a public radio producer.

Early life
Ostroushko was born and raised in upstate New York. In 1973, she graduated from Wittenberg University with a Bachelor of Arts in East Asian Studies and Environmental Studies.

Career
In 2001, Ostroushko co-created the public radio show Speaking of Faith. From 1977 to 1983, she was a producer at the public radio show A Prairie Home Companion hosted by Garrison Keillor. The show won a Peabody during her tenure. She has won two Peabody Awards as an executive producer, for Mississippi: River of Song and The Promised Land.

Ostroushko worked in new program development and marketing for Public Radio International for ten years. In 2008, she and Majora Carter co-produced the pilot episode of The Promised Land, which won a three-way competition for a Corporation for Public Broadcasting Talent Quest grant. The one-hour program debuted on over 150 public radio stations across the US on January 19, 2009, was renewed for the 2010/2011 season, and earned a 2010 Peabody Award.

Ostroushko is a partner of Launch Productions, a collaboration in national programming development.

Personal life
Ostroushko was married to mandolin player Peter Ostroushko, who died in February 2021.

References

External links 
 The Promised Land

1951 births
Living people
People from New York (state)
American radio producers
Women radio producers